The Osiris Child: Science Fiction Volume One (also known simply as The Osiris Child and in Europe as Origin Wars) is a 2016 Australian science fiction film directed by Shane Abbess and starring Daniel MacPherson, Kellan Lutz, and Rachel Griffiths.

Premise
Sy Lombrok (Kellan Lutz), a former nurse, is thrown together with Kane Sommerville (Daniel MacPherson), a lieutenant who works for Exor – an off-earth military contract company in humanity's extra-terrestrial future – as they search for Kane's young daughter Indi (Teagan Croft) before disaster strikes.

Cast
 Kellan Lutz as Sy Lombrok
 Daniel MacPherson as Lieutenant Kane Sommerville
 Isabel Lucas as Gyp
 Luke Ford as Bill
 Rachel Griffiths as General Lynex
 Temuera Morrison as Warden Mourdain
 Teagan Croft as Indi Sommerville
 Bren Foster as Charles Kreat
 Dwaine Stevenson as The Ragged
 Grace Huang as Jandi
 Firass Dirani as Clarence Carmel
 Brendan Clearkin as Bostok Kramer

Production
Shooting took place in Coober Pedy in South Australia and Gladesville and Sydney in New South Wales. The producers credited include director Shane Abbess and Brian Cachia, with Cachia also composing the music.

Release
The Osiris Child: Science Fiction Volume One was released in the United States at Fantastic Fest in September 2016. It premiered in Australia at the Gold Coast Film Festival on 21 April 2017.

Reception
Joe Leydon of Variety praised the film for the acting, while Andy Webster praised the director, Shane Abbess. Michael Reichshaffen of Los Angeles Times criticized the screenplay by Brian Cachia, pointing out that it "lacks novelty". On review aggregator website Rotten Tomatoes, the film holds an approval rating of 62%, based on 21 reviews, and an average rating of 5.9/10.

References

External links

2016 films
Australian science fiction action films
Australian science fiction adventure films
Dystopian films
Films set on fictional planets
Films about genetic engineering
Films about dreams
2016 science fiction action films
2010s science fiction adventure films
2010s action adventure films
Films shot in South Australia
2010s English-language films